Bodaybo Airport  is a regional airport built in Bodaybo, Irkutsk Oblast, Russia, during World War II for the Alaska-Siberian (ALSIB) air route used to ferry American Lend-Lease aircraft to the Eastern Front. In 2017 it handled 51,910 passengers.

Airlines and destinations

References

External links

Airports in Irkutsk Oblast